Peinado is a Spanish surname. Notable people with the surname include:

Bruno Peinado (born 1970), French artist
Carlos Peinado (born 1954), Uruguayan basketball player
Daniel Peinado (born 1967), Argentine footballer
Danilo Peinado (born 1985), Uruguayan footballer
María Peinado (born 1977), Spanish athlete
Robeilys Peinado (born 1997), Venezuelan pole vaulter

Spanish-language surnames